A serial rapist is someone who commits multiple rapes, whether with multiple victims or a single victim repeatedly over a period of time. This list does not include serial killers who raped their victims then killed them; only serial rapists who non-fatally attacked their victims and raped them should be included here. This list should include serial rapists with at least three victims. Serial killers who raped at least three victims without murdering them are also included.

See also
 Serial rapist
 List of serial killers by number of victims
 Victimology

References

Serial
Serial Rapists
Lists of criminals